Valeriy Mikhaylovych Kryvov (29 September 1951 – 20 December 1994) was a Ukrainian former volleyball player who competed for the Soviet Union in the 1980 Summer Olympics.

He was born in Krychaw, Byelorussian SSR.

In 1980, he was part of the Soviet team which won the gold medal in the Olympic tournament. He played all five matches.

External links
 

1951 births
1994 deaths
Ukrainian men's volleyball players
Soviet men's volleyball players
Olympic volleyball players of the Soviet Union
Volleyball players at the 1980 Summer Olympics
Olympic gold medalists for the Soviet Union
Olympic medalists in volleyball
People from Krychaw
Medalists at the 1980 Summer Olympics